Taylorsville is a town in Bartow and Polk counties in the U.S. state of Georgia. The population was 211 at the 2012 census.

History
Taylorsville was surveyed circa 1870 by Edward G. Taylor, and named for him. The Georgia General Assembly incorporated Taylorsville as a town in 1916.

Geography

Climate
Taylorsville has a humid subtropical climate (Köppen climate classification Cfa), with cool to mild winters and hot, humid summers.

Demographics

2020 census

As of the 2020 United States census, there were 252 people, 100 households, and 70 families residing in the town.

2010 census
As of the census of 2010, the population was 3,796. The racial makeup of the town was 93.45% White, 4.37% African American, 0.87% from other races, and 1.31% from two or more races. Hispanic or Latino people of any race were 1.75% of the population.

There were 93 households, out of which 28.0% had children under the age of 18 living with them, 64.5% were married couples living together, 5.4% had a female householder with no husband present, and 25.8% were non-families. 23.7% of all households were made up of individuals, and 16.1% had someone living alone who was 65 years of age or older.  The average household size was 2.46 and the average family size was 2.84.

In the town, the population was spread out, with 21.4% under the age of 18, 6.1% from 18 to 24, 31.4% from 25 to 44, 24.0% from 45 to 64, and 17.0% who were 65 years of age or older.  The median age was 38 years. For every 100 females, there were 90.8 males.  For every 100 females age 18 and over, there were 91.5 males.

The median income for a household in the town was $39,375, and the median income for a family was $51,250. Males had a median income of $32,500 versus $20,625 for females. The per capita income for the town was $22,135.  None of the families and 2.1% of the population were living below the poverty line, including no under eighteens and 6.1% of those over 64.

Education
Students living in Taylorsville attend schools within the Bartow County School District.

 Taylorsville Elementary School
 Woodland Middle School (in Euharlee)
 Woodland High School (in Cartersville)

A few students living in a portion of Taylorsville that extends into Polk County attend schools within the Polk County School District.

Healthcare
Floyd Primary Care Center serves residents within the Taylorsville and Rockmart area. The center also holds the Center for Diabetes of Taylorsville.

Four area hospitals serve residents of Taylorsville.

 Wellstar Paulding Regional Hospital, in Hiram
 Cartersville Medical Center, in Cartersville
 Floyd Medical Center, in Rome
 Redmond Regional Medical Center, in Rome
 WellStar Kennestone Regional Medical Center, 36 miles away in Marietta

Emergency services in Taylorsville are primarily provided by the Bartow County Fire Department and EMS.

Georgia Power Plant Bowen
Plant Bowen is a coal-fired power station located near Taylorsville. At 3,499 megawatts, Plant Bowen has the second largest generating capacity of any coal-fired power plant in North America, and the largest in the United States; only Ontario Power Generation's Nanticoke Generating Station in Canada has more generating capacity. Plant Bowen ranked third in the nation for net generation in 2006 producing over 22,630,000 MWh. The station is connected to the southeastern power grid by numerous 500 kV transmission lines, and is owned and operated by Georgia Power, a subsidiary of Southern Company.

Notable people
Willard Nixon (1928–2000), Boston Red Sox player
Charlie Sproull (1919–1980), Philadelphia Phillies player

References

External links
 Town of Taylorsville

Towns in Georgia (U.S. state)
Towns in Bartow County, Georgia
Towns in Polk County, Georgia